The Udawalawe Elephant Transist Home also known as Udawalawa Ath Athuru Sewana is a facility within Udawalawe National Park in Sri Lanka that was established in 1995 by the Sri Lanka Department of Wildlife Conservation. Its primary objective is to rehabilitate orphaned elephant calves for ultimate release back into the wild.

History

Sri Lankan elephants (Elephas maximus maximus) are an endangered species and their survival in their natural habitats is threatened due to human activities. Elephants in the wild are constantly being killed, and many elephant calves become orphaned. In order to support these orphaned elephants, the Department of Wildlife Conservation set up the Elephant Transit Home within Udawalawe National Park with help from the Born Free Foundation. The facility was established  under the 29th Amendment to the Fauna and Flora Protection Ordinance Part II.

As of 8 February 2009, 39 orphaned elephant calves were being looked after. The elephant calves are released to the jungle after they become strong enough to survive in their natural habitats. As of 2008, sixty-five elephants had been released to the jungle.

Facilities and care

The main objective of this facility is rehabilitation of orphaned baby elephants to ultimately release them back into their natural habitat. Up to three elephants per week are killed in Sri Lanka due to conflicts with humans, often leaving behind orphan calves.  The elephants are kept at part of the Udawalawe National Park to maintain familiarity with their habitat, but have access to both food and medical care.

All care at the facility is by trained staff, and efforts are made to minimize contact between elephants and humans to keep the elephants from becoming acclimated to humans. Although visitors can watch the elephants being fed, they are not allowed to touch or otherwise interact with them.

There is also an Information Centre set up and maintained by Dilmah Conservation at the facility. The centre houses an extensive collection of information on elephants, from their origins and evolution to their social behavior and threats. It was established to give visitors a better understanding of elephants and their plight. Additionally, a solar heater was set up at the facility by Dilmah Conservation to heat the water used to make the milk fed to the orphaned elephants.

Foster parent scheme

Since caring for elephants is expensive, the Department of Wildlife Conservation created a foster-parent program to help pay for the required food and medicine. Individuals and groups that foster an elephant are entitled to certain privileges, including:

 Naming the elephant.
 Taking photographs of the elephant.
 A free circuit bungalow in Udawalawe National Park for two days per year.
 Publicity for the foster-parent
 The foster-parent and elephant's name displayed at the Elephant Transfer House and the head office of the department.
 Involvement in the release when the elephant is returned to the wild.

Release program

While at the center, contact with humans is deliberately minimized so that the elephants will not acclimate to humans. Elephant calves are looked after until they are 5 years old, when they are released into the wild. The elephants are fitted with radio collars to help wildlife officials monitor their movements, behavior and progress. To erase any residual human smell and help ensure their acceptance among their wild cousins, the elephants are given a bath in diluted elephant dung before being released.

See also
Pinnawela Elephant Orphanage
Wildlife of Sri Lanka

References

Tourism in Sri Lanka
Elephant sanctuaries
Wildlife rehabilitation and conservation centers
Wildlife conservation in Sri Lanka
Buildings and structures in Sabaragamuwa Province
Environmental organisations based in Sri Lanka